Calanthe densiflora is a species of orchid. It is native to Nepal, eastern India, Bhutan, Bangladesh, Myanmar, Thailand, Vietnam, Nansei-shoto (the Ryukyu Islands) and China (Guangdong, Guangxi, Hainan, Sichuan, Taiwan, Tibet, and Yunnan).

References

External links 
 
 

densiflora
Plants described in 1833
Orchids of India
Orchids of China
Flora of the Indian subcontinent
Flora of Indo-China
Flora of the Ryukyu Islands